is a Japanese manga writer and artist from Okinawa Prefecture. He started making manga in 1990.

Norihiro Yagi is a successful manga artist, having won the 32nd Akatsuka Award for his very first work: Undeadman. Undeadman appeared in Monthly Shōnen Jump and has had two sequels. Yagi's first serialized manga was his comedy-genre Angel Densetsu, which appeared in Monthly Shōnen Jump from 1992 to 2000. His next serialized manga, Claymore, ran in the magazine between 2001 and 2014, completing at 155 chapters. Viz Media localized the manga for the North American market, and have released all 27 volumes in English as of October, 2015. His most recent series, Ariadne in the Blue Sky, was serialized in Shogakukan's Weekly Shōnen Sunday between 2017 and 2023.

Yagi's favorite things to do in his spare time are to listen to hard rock music, play video games, drive, and perform martial arts. Yagi's favorite Japanese comedic duo is Downtown.

Publications
 Undeadman – one-shot, 1990
 Angel Densetsu – 15 volumes, 1992 – 2000
 Claymore – 27 volumes, 2001 – 2014
 Arcadia of the Moonlight – one-shot, 2017
   – 22 volumes, 2017 – 2023

References

External links 
 Norihiro Yagi  at Media Arts Database 
 

1968 births
Living people
Manga artists from Okinawa Prefecture
People from Naha
People from Okinawa Prefecture
Ryukyuan people